The Sibley fire was a 1904 fire in Rochester, New York.

The worst conflagration in the city's history at the time, the fire broke out shortly before 5 o'clock on February 26, 1904, in the basement of the Rochester Dry Goods company's store at 156 Main street. Hampered by bitter cold, the fire burned for 40 hours, engulfing the north side of East Main Street, spanning from St. Paul Street to just short of Clinton Avenue. The estimated loss was about $3,000,000 ( when adjusted for inflation).

The fire was reported to have been started by an uninsulated overloaded electrical fuse at the Rochester Dry Goods Company.

Notes

References

 

Building and structure fires in the United States
Commercial building fires
February 1904 events
Fires in New York (state)
History of Rochester, New York
1904 fires in the United States
1904 in New York (state)